Susanne Lahme (born 10 September 1968 in Luckenwalde) is a former German indoor and beach volleyball player.

Indoor volleyball career
Lahme began her career in the indoor volleyball in 1980 playing at SC Dynamo Berlin and was eight times East German and unified German champion and nine-time German Cup winner. With the East Germany national team she was the 1987 European champion and two-time European Championship runner-up (1985 and 1989). In 1991 she was third at the European Championships with the already unified German national team. In 1992 and 1993 she was chosen the German Volleyball Player of the Year.

She took part in three editions of the Olympic Games in 1988 (with East Germany), 1996 and 2000 and reached the fifth (Seoul), eighth (Atlanta) and sixth places (Sydney). There is also a fifth-place finish at the 1994 World Championships in São Paulo, Brazil. Her successful indoor career was ended after the 2002–03 season in Italy. At club level she played in Italy and Brazil as well as Germany. In 1995 she won the European CEV Cup playing with the Italian team Ecoclear Sumirago Varese. In 1996 she won the Champions League in Wien against Uralochka Ekateninburg playing with the team PVF Latte Rugiada Parmalat Matera. With the team Foppapedretti Bergamo she won the Italian Supercup in 1997 and the Italian Cup in 1998. She also won the Cup Winners' Cup with the team Despar Perugia in 2000.

Beach volleyball career 
In 2001, Lahme started a beach volleyball parallel career. As of 2002, she formed a duo with Danja Müsch and started at the FIVB Beach Volleyball World Tour. In 2004, they played at the Athens Summer Olympics, which she finished in ninth place after losing in the Round of 16 to Daniela Gattelli and Lucilla Perrotta, from Italy.

After a knee surgery in August 2007, she finished her career as an athlete and trained and supervised in 2008 their compatriots Geeske Banck (her 2006–07 partner) and Anja Günther.

References

External links
 
 
 Susanne Lahme at LegaVolleyFemminile.it 
 
 
 

1968 births
Living people
Sportspeople from Luckenwalde
People from Bezirk Potsdam
German women's volleyball players
German women's beach volleyball players
Olympic volleyball players of East Germany
Olympic volleyball players of Germany
Olympic beach volleyball players of Germany
Volleyball players at the 1988 Summer Olympics
Volleyball players at the 1996 Summer Olympics
Volleyball players at the 2000 Summer Olympics
Beach volleyball players at the 2004 Summer Olympics
20th-century German women